The JS 9 mm, also known as the CS/LS2, is a commercial export version of the QCW-05. It is a suppressed submachine gun developed by the Jianshe Industries (Group) Corporation of Chongqing. The JS 9 mm is capable of using any 9×19mm round, including the popular 9×19mm Parabellum round but has specifically been chambered for the indigenous, armour-piercing 9×19mm DAP92-9 round.

Development
Following the unveiling of the QCW-05 submachine gun at the 2005 International Police Equipment Expo in Beijing, Jianshe Industries (Group) Corporation, a company under the China South Industries Group Corporation state-owned conglomerate presented an export variant of their latest submachine gun at the 2006 MILIPOL expo named the 'JS 9 mm'. The submachine gun was a bullpup, select-fire, open bolt, blowback operated submachine gun with a screwable suppressor that is capable of using many different 9×19mm cartridges. Internally the JS 9 mm is exactly the same as the QCW-05, which is a submachine gun designed for use by the People's Liberation Army Ground Force, People's Liberation Army Special Operations Forces and the People's Armed Police except for the different chambering. The JS 9 mm is designed for export to the international market, specifically at various police and law enforcement forces and not for domestic use either with military or any police force. Currently the JS 9 mm is exported worldwide by NORINCO Equipment, Ltd. through a marketing agreement with China South Industries Group.

Design details
Internally, the JS 9 mm is identical to the QCW-05. The only difference between the two submachine guns is that the JS 9 mm is slightly smaller and lighter compared to the QCW-05 and uses the common 9×19mm round. The JS 9 mm is also capable of accepting widely used MP5 magazines along with its own double-column, 30-round, box magazine. As the JS 9 mm does not share the QCW-05's carry handle, the sight bridge is mounted on top of a receiver on a Picatinny rail and can be removed in favour of a multitude of aiming equipment. The JS 9 mm possesses three different firing modes, automatic, semi-automatic and safety.

See also
QCW-05
QBZ-95

References

External links
Sinodefence report
Modern Firearms article on the JS 9mm

9mm Parabellum submachine guns
Submachine guns of the People's Republic of China
Bullpup firearms